Mangnall is a surname. Notable people with the surname include:

Anthony Mangnall (born 1989), British politician
Dave Mangnall (1905–1962), British football player and manager
Ernest Mangnall (1866–1932), British football manager 
Richmal Mangnall (1769–1820), British schoolmistress and schoolbook author